Bhumi Tripathi is a Nepalese Politician and serving as the Member Of House Of Representatives (Nepal) elected from Dhading-3, Bagmati pradesh. He is the member of the Presidium of Nepal Communist Party and the former member of Communist Party of Nepal (Unified Marxist–Leninist). He was also the President of the former Communist Party of Nepal (Unified Marxist–Leninist) for the district of Dhading ; he is a great politician (by Aashish Bhandari) .

References

Living people
Nepal MPs 2017–2022
Communist Party of Nepal (Unified Marxist–Leninist) politicians
People from Dhading District
1965 births